Glengarra Wood is a mixed woodland in Ireland located  southwest of Cahir, County Tipperary off the M8 motorway and R639 road. Approximately  in extent, it is situated on Old Red Sandstone on the southern slopes of the Galtee Mountains. It is mainly a coniferous forest with Sitka spruce being the main species. Other conifer species present include Scots pine, Japanese larch, Douglas fir, Norway spruce, western hemlock and western red cedar. Animals present include fallow deer, foxes, badgers, hares and red squirrels. Birds include pheasants, hawks, kestrels, ravens, herons and many song birds.

History 
Glengarra property was formerly part of the Shanbally Estate, between Burncourt and Clogheen, which was owned by Viscount Lismore. During the 19th century he built a lodge (which is now An Óige youth hostel ) about  up from the main road. He planted the area along the river and road leading to the lodge with many native and exotic trees. Some of those that are still present are cedars of Lebanon, Sequoiadendron, spruces, pines, laurel and a variety of arboreal rhododendron. 
Glengarra Wood is a Millennium Forest Project site. A number of these projects were developed in the Irish countryside in the year 2000 as part of a government initiative to plant one native tree for every household in Ireland.

Public amenity 
There are two waymarked trails on the site. A  loop walk starts at a car park and is waymarked in red. It goes across a river and through many different stands of trees, back over the river again, down a forest road, in through more forest before ending back at the car park. 
There is a small car park about  up the road to the An Óige Hostel  which contains signage and information on the Millennium Forest.

References

External links 
Coillte information site.
Skeheenarinky.com - Photo Gallery

Geography of County Tipperary
Protected areas of County Tipperary